Karl Geiger (born 6 March 1941) is an Austrian sailor. He competed at the 1964 Summer Olympics and the 1968 Summer Olympics.

References

External links
 

1941 births
Living people
Austrian male sailors (sport)
Olympic sailors of Austria
Sailors at the 1964 Summer Olympics – Flying Dutchman
Sailors at the 1968 Summer Olympics – Flying Dutchman
Place of birth missing (living people)